Pegognaga is a comune (municipality) in the Province of Mantua in the Italian region of Lombardy, located about  southeast of Milan and about  south of Mantua.

History
The name may come from the Latin Pecunius, a Roman aristocrat who, in the 1st century AD founded a little agricultural village. It also might be connected to the word pecunia, which in Latin means money, richness, referring to the lands of that place that could offer profitable harvests.

External links
 Official website

Cities and towns in Lombardy